Shelf is in the ward of Northowram and Shelf in the metropolitan borough of Calderdale, West Yorkshire, England. It contains 28 listed buildings that are recorded in the National Heritage List for England. Of these, one is listed at Grade I, the highest of the three grades, two are at Grade II*, the middle grade, and the others are at Grade II, the lowest grade. The ward contains the village of Shelf and the surrounding area.  Most of the listed buildings are houses, cottages and associated structures, farmhouses, and farm buildings. The other listed buildings include a guide post, a public house, a church, two boundary stones, a milestone, a set of stocks, and the archway to a former brewery.


Key

Buildings

References

Citations

Sources

Lists of listed buildings in West Yorkshire